Tethering, or phone-as-modem (PAM) is the sharing of a mobile device's Internet connection with other connected computers. Connection of a mobile device with other devices can be done over wireless LAN (Wi-Fi), over Bluetooth or by physical connection using a cable, for example through USB.

If tethering is done over WLAN, the feature may be branded as a personal hotspot or mobile hotspot, which allows the device to serve as a portable router. Mobile hotspots may be protected by a PIN or password. The Internet-connected mobile device can act as a portable wireless access point and router for devices connected to it.

Mobile device's OS support
Many mobile devices are equipped with software to offer tethered Internet access. Windows Mobile 6.5, Windows Phone 7, Android (starting from version 2.2), and iOS 3.0 (or later) offer tethering over a Bluetooth PAN or a USB connection. Tethering over Wi-Fi, also known as Personal Hotspot, is available on iOS starting with iOS 4.2.5 (or later) on iPhone 4 or iPad (3rd gen), certain Windows Mobile 6.5 devices like the HTC HD2, Windows Phone 7, 8 and 8.1 devices (varies by manufacturer and model), and certain Android phones (varies widely depending on carrier, manufacturer, and software version).

For IPv4 networks, the tethering normally works via NAT on the handset's existing data connection, so from the network point of view, there is just one device with a single IPv4 network address, though it is technically possible to attempt to identify multiple machines.

On some mobile network operators, this feature is contractually unavailable by default, and may be activated only by paying to add a tethering package to a data plan or choosing a data plan that includes tethering. This is done primarily because with a computer sharing the network connection, there is typically substantially more network traffic.

Some network-provided devices have carrier-specific software that may deny the inbuilt tethering ability normally available on the device, or enable it only if the subscriber pays an additional fee. Some operators have asked Google or any mobile device producer using Android to completely remove tethering capability from the operating system on certain devices. Handsets purchased SIM-free, without a network provider subsidy, are often unhindered with regard to tethering.

There are, however, several ways to enable tethering on restricted devices without paying the carrier for it, including 3rd party USB Tethering apps such as PDAnet, rooting Android devices or jailbreaking iOS devices and installing a tethering application on the device. Tethering is also available as a downloadable third-party application on most Symbian mobile phones as well as on the MeeGo platform and on WebOS mobiles phones.

In carriers' contracts

Depending on the wireless carrier, a user's cellular device may have restricted functionality. While tethering may be allowed at no extra cost, some carriers impose a one-time charge to enable tethering and others forbid tethering or impose added data charges. Contracts that advertise "unlimited" data usage often have limits detailed in a Fair usage policy.

United Kingdom 
Since 2014, all pay-monthly plans from the Three network in the UK include a "personal hotspot" feature.

Earlier, two tethering-permitted mobile plans offered unlimited data: The Full Monty on T-Mobile, and The One Plan on Three. Three offered tethering as a standard feature until early 2012, retaining it on selected plans. T-Mobile dropped tethering on its unlimited data plans in late 2012.

United States

As cited in Sprint Nextel's "Terms of Service":

"Except with Phone-as-Modem plans, you may not use a mobile device (including a Bluetooth device) as a modem in connection with any computer. We reserve the right to deny or terminate service without notice for any misuse or any use that adversely affects network performance."

T-Mobile USA has a similar clause in its "Terms & Conditions": 
"Unless explicitly permitted by your Data Plan, other uses, including for example, using your Device as a modem or tethering your Device to a personal computer or other hardware, are not permitted."

T-Mobile's Simple Family or Simple Business plans offer "Hotspot" from devices that offer that function (such as Apple iPhone) to up to five devices. Since March, 27, 2014, 1000 MB per month is free in the US with cellular service. The host device has unlimited slow internet for the rest of the month, and all month while roaming in 100 countries, but with no tethering. For US$10 or $20 per month more per host device, the amount of data available for tethering can be increased markedly. The host device cellular services can be canceled, added, or changed at any time, pro-rated, data tethering levels can be changed month-to-month, and T-Mobile no longer requires any long-term service contracts, allowing users to bring their own devices or buy devices from them, independent of whether they continue service with them.

 Verizon Wireless and AT&T Mobility offer wired tethering to their plans for a fee, while Sprint Nextel offers a Wi-Fi connected "mobile hotspot" tethering feature at an added charge. However, actions by the FCC and a small claims court in California may make it easier for consumers to tether. On July 31, 2012, the FCC released an unofficial announcement of Commission action, decreeing Verizon Wireless must pay $1.25 million to resolve the investigation regarding compliance of the C Block Spectrum (see US Wireless Spectrum Auction of 2008). The announcement also stated that "(Verizon) recently revised its service offerings such that consumers on usage-based pricing plans may tether, using any application, without paying an additional fee." After that judgement, Verizon released "Share Everything" plans that enable tethering, however users must drop old plans they were grandfathered under (such as the Unlimited Data plans) and switch, or pay a tethering fee.

In another instance, Judge Russell Nadel of the Ventura Superior Court awarded AT&T customer Matt Spaccarelli $850, despite the fact that Spaccarelli had violated his terms of service by jailbreaking his iPhone in order to fully utilize his iPhone's hardware. Spaccarelli demonstrated that AT&T had unfairly throttled his data connection. His data shows that AT&T had been throttling his connection after approximately 2 GB of data was used. Spaccarelli responded by creating a personal web page in order to provide information that allows others to file a similar lawsuit, commenting:

"Hopefully with all this concrete data and the courts on our side, AT&T will be forced to change something. Let’s just hope it chooses to go the way of Sprint, not T-Mobile."

While T-Mobile did eventually allow tethering, on August 31, 2015, the company announced it will punish users who abuse its unlimited data by violating T-Mobile's rules on tethering (which unlike standard data does carry a 7 GB cap before throttling takes effect) by permanently kicking them off the unlimited plans and making users sign up for tiered data plans. T-Mobile mentioned that it was only a small handful of users who abused the tethering rules by using an Android app that masks T-Mobile's tethering monitoring and uses as much as 2 TB's per month, causing speed issues for most customers who don't abuse the rules.

As of 2023 AD (year two After Corona *AC*), "tethering" is also refers to the tetherorg idea of one's most trusted connections. Tethering is to make a contact in one's phone especially designated to help in any crises. More can be found at tetherorg.com.

See also
 Internet Connection Sharing
 Mobile broadband
 Mobile Internet device (MID)
 Mobile modems and routers
 Open Garden
 Smartbook
 Smartphone

References

Wireless networking
Mobile telecommunications
Net neutrality